Leiomodin-3 is a protein that in humans is encoded by the LMOD3 gene. Leiomodin-3 is especially present at the pointed end of muscle thin filaments.

Clinical significance
Dysfunction is associated with thin filament disorganisation and nemaline myopathy.

References

Further reading